Cracking pattern may refer to:

 Cracking pattern (engineering), the fracture surfaces of materials
 Cracking pattern (painting), the fine pattern of dense cracking formed on the surface of paintings
 Patterns in nature#Cracks, the patterns formed by cracks of different types in nature